The Joylong EM3 is an electric city car made by Joylong.

Overview

The Joylong EM3 was shown in 2019. It has dimensions of 3180 mm/1495 mm/1720 mm, a wheelbase of 2100 mm, and a weight of 1155 kg. The EM3 has 5 doors and 5 seats, and will be priced from $10,000 to $20,000.

Performance
The Joylong EM3 has an electric motor that develops 40 hp and 150 Nm, good for a 80 km/h top speed. Range is 380 kilometers. Charging takes 12.5 hours with an onboard charger or 2 hours.

Solar Powered
A solar powered EM3 concept was launched by Hanergy. It had a 60% battery charge that held for 8 days, and could run on full battery without being charged for 30 days.

See Also
Joylong
Hanergy

References

External Links
Official website

Cars introduced in 2019
Cars of China
EM3
Microvans
Solar-powered vehicles